The following table presents a listing of Palau’s state governors.

See also
List of presidents of Palau
List of current heads of state and government

References

Palauan politicians
Government of Palau
Governors
Palau